Geneva Commons is a lifestyle center in the Chicago suburb of Geneva, Illinois. The center is located along Randall Road in the heart of the St. Charles/Geneva/Batavia retail complex. The center, which was developed by Jeffrey R. Anderson, was opened on September 5, 2002.

It is managed by Mid-America Asset Management, Inc.

The opening of Geneva Commons was one of the factors in the demise of Charlestowne Mall in St. Charles, Illinois.

References

External links
Geneva Commons

Shopping malls in Illinois
Shopping malls in Kane County, Illinois
Shopping malls established in 2002
Geneva, Illinois
2002 establishments in Illinois
Lifestyle centers (retail)